This is a list of the members of the Australian House of Representatives in the Seventh Australian Parliament, which was elected at the 1917 election on 5 May 1917.

Notes

Members of Australian parliaments by term
20th-century Australian politicians